Karim Oumarou (born 7 January 1985) is a Nigerien football player. He played for the Niger national football team during 2010 FIFA World Cup qualification, scoring an own goal against Benin.  He is the current captain of Sahel SC who play in the Niger Premier League.  He is known to be a versatile defender, being able to fill in at any position across the back 4, as well as being a useful winger.

References

External links

Living people
1985 births
Nigerien footballers
Niger international footballers
Association football defenders
Sahel SC players
People from Niamey